Pool C of the 2014 Fed Cup Americas Group II was one of four pools in the Americas Group II of the 2014 Fed Cup. Three teams competed in a round robin competition, with the top team and the bottom two teams proceeding to their respective sections of the play-offs: the top team played for advancement to the Group I.

Standings

Round-robin

Peru vs. Bermuda

Bolivia vs. Bermuda

Peru vs. Bolivia

References

External links 
 Fed Cup website

C2